Setia Alam (Jawi: ستيا عالم) is a township located in Shah Alam, Selangor, Malaysia. It is accessible via Setia Alam Highway from the New Klang Valley Expressway (NKVE) since the interchange was opened on 14 July 2006. Setia Alam is also accessible from the Federal Highway and Klang via Jalan Meru. This township is developed by S P Setia Berhad.

It falls under the jurisdiction of the Shah Alam City Council (MBSA) which had placed restrictions on the establishment of entertainment outlets such as pubs, discos and lottery business.

Setia Alam is represented in the Parliament by the Member of Parliament for Shah Alam, Azli Yusof and State Assemblyman for Kota Anggerik, Mohd Najwan Halimi.

History 
This RM 20 billion township was launched in 2004 by SP Setia Berhad. It was formerly known as North Hummock Estate, which was owned by the family-controlled See Hoy Chan Group. However, instead of developing the land themselves, the group sold the land to SP Setia.

The project consists of a few major developments marketed as Setia Alam (a 2,525-acre integrated township with mixed residential and commercial development), Setia Eco Park (791 acres of fully gated and guarded luxury semi-dee and bungalow development and is Malaysia's first eco township), Setia City (a 240-acre integrated green city centre development), Alam Nusantara by PKNS and Anjung Sari by Sazean Group. Both Alam Nusantara's and Anjung Sari's lands (totaling 614.26 acres) were sold by SP Setia to PKNS as parts of SP Setia's strategies to develop the Setia Alam development.
SP Setia's Setia Alam and Setia Eco Park townships have won a number of awards locally and internationally, including the World's Best Master Plan Development for Setia Eco Park in FIABCI International Prix d'Excellence Award 2007 held in Barcelona, Spain. In 2013, Setia Alam won the World's Best Master Plan Development in FIABCI, held in Taichung, Taiwan.

Today, both Setia Alam and Setia Eco Park are some of the most sought after residential townships in the Klang Valley.

Known issues 
Despite its award-winning developer and concepts, Setia Alam is also known to suffer from soil settlement. Houses in older phases are reported to be affected by the soil settlement. Walls were cracked and leaning by more than 15 degrees. The developer took responsibility by re-building the walls out of goodwill.

Location and accessibility 
Setia Alam is located on the western flank of Shah Alam, just adjacent to its boundary with Klang. It is served by a spur route of the NKVE . Selangor State Route  links Setia Alam to Puncak Alam and ultimately Kuala Selangor due north and downtown Klang due south.

The closest rail station is the  KTM Klang, about 7.6 km south. RapidKL bus route 753 connects Setia Alam to the Section 14 bus hub in downtown Shah Alam.

Traffic crawls along the NKVE-Setia Alam Link during rush hour have become rampant in recent years as more residents moved into the township especially with the completion of apartments at Setia Alam North and spillover from neighbouring townships, such as Bandar Bukit Raja, Aman Perdana and Meru.

On 18 April 2018, Eco World's township Eco Ardence which adjacent Setia Alam, has opened a link road from Eco Ardence (North) to Setia Damai 15/16. This new road can be accessed from NKVE Setia Alam Toll.

Opening of DASH highway provide alternative highway other than NKVE for Setia Alam residents.

Features
The residential development in Setia Alam was marketed with the following features:

 Single entry to every neighbourhood to facilitate vehicle entry
 North-south oriented units
 Village green and Green Fingers
 Natural barriers - plants and water bodies for security.
 Environment-friendly development - MASMA (Manual Saliran Mesra Alam Malaysia) requirements
 Concealed underground electric cables and drainage
 Built-in security alarm system connected to a local CMS and Internet broadband access.
 36 months home warranty.
 Industrial-free zone development.

The current development and launches are focused on Precincts 1, 2, 3, 5, 6, 7, 8, 9, 11, 15 and 17.

Precinct 1, Setia City (Setia Dagang)
The heart of Setia Alam, it is a 240-acre green commercial city centre which houses a regional mall, a convention centre, a city park, corporate towers, SOFOs, condominiums, serviced apartments, hotels, a medical centre, a police station, a transportation hub and others.

Precinct 2 (Setia Duta), Precinct 3 (Setia Nusantara) and Precinct 5 (Setia Tropika)
These 3 precincts are luxury residential enclaves in Setia Eco Park.

Precinct 6 (Setia Damai)
Precinct 6 consists of residential development with a gated and guarded facilities. Also known as Setia Damai, the area is the highest point in entire Setia Alam township.

Precinct 7 (Setia Indah)
Precinct 7 is between Precinct 6 and 8. Precinct 7 consists of mixed residential development. The Setia Alam Welcome Centre, which hosts the show units, sales office, and customer service center and the Eramas 7 commercial centre are located here.

Precinct 8 (Setia Impian)
Precinct 8 is on south west of Setia Alam, where commercial developments such as Tesco, Setia Eramas 8, Setia Alam Club and Setia Avenue are located. Klang Valley's first Starbucks stand-alone building and a few fast food chains namely KFC, Pizza Hut and Burger King drive thru cum restaurants are located here.
The popular pasar malam Setia Alam is located along Jalan Setia Prima A U13/A, fronting Jalan Meru, Klang.

Precinct 9 (Setia Murni)
Precinct 9, located in the west of Setia Alam, consists of a low-cost apartment housing scheme, namely Seroja Apartment. Other than this residential scheme, most of the elements built in Precinct 9 are commercial and educational hub. Setia Alam Auto City consists of several popular automobile 3S/4S centres, which include BMW, Honda and Toyota. For the educational front, the Pin Hwa Chinese School, Australia's Peninsula School and Setia Badminton Academy are located here. The 1 National Institute Of Health or known as 1NIH is completed in 2018 and is built on a 55.33 acres of land. 
The National Institute of Health (1NIH) is an integrated health and research institute development funded by the Ministry of Health, Malaysia. This complex consists of many institutions such as the Medical Research, Public Health, Health Management, Health Behavioral Research etc. Besides that, there are other shared facilities such as an auditorium, multipurpose halls, lecture halls and accommodations.

Precinct 11 (Setia Utama)

Mass housing development consisting of terraced houses. Setia Taipan 2 commercial centre, a stand-alone McDonald's,  Wetland Park, 2 Petrol station are located here.

Precinct 15 (Setia Gemilang)

The only precinct in Setia Alam to consist only of  mid-rises residential properties. The 'Seri' series medium cost apartments and Rumah Selangorku apartment housing scheme are located here, besides the Setia Taipan commercial centre.

Precinct 17 (Setia Permai)

In this precinct, mass housing development to consist of terraced houses, a low-cost housing scheme and Rumah Selangorku apartment housing scheme.
A proposed public library, a Pasar Muhibbah, a post office, a bus depot are in the pipeline for this precinct.

Awards and recognition
FIABCI Malaysia Property Award

 Best Affordable Housing 2017 - Seri Kasturi Apartment, Setia Alam
 Best Sustainable Development 2015 - S P Setia Corporate Headquarters, Selangor
 Best Retail Development 2013 – Setia City Mall, Selangor
 Best Master Plan Development 2012 - Setia Alam, Selangor - 2006 - Setia Eco Park, Selangor
 Best Residential (Low-Rise) Development 2010 - Setia Eco Park, Selangor

FIABCI World Prix d'Excellence Awards

 World Gold Winner of FIABCI World Prix d’ Excellence Award 2018 Affordable Housing Category 2018 - Seri Kasturi Apartment, Setia Alam, Selangor
 Gold Winner of Sustainable Development Category 2016 - S P Setia Corporate Headquarters
 Best Retail Development 2014 - Setia City Mall, Selangor
 Best Master Plan Development 2013 - Setia Alam, Selangor 2007 - Setia Eco Park, Selangor
 Best Residential (Low-Rise) Development 2011 - Setia Eco Park, Selangor

The Edge Malaysia Top Property Developers Awards

 Affordable Urban Housing Excellence Award 2017 - Seri Mutiara Apartment, Selangor 2016 - Seri Kasturi Apartment, Selangor
 Notable Property Achievement 2015 - Setia Eco Park, Selangor
 PAM Green Excellence Awards 2015 - Setia Corporate HQ, Selangor 2013 - Setia City Mall

Banks
 Ambank
 Bank Islam
 Bank Simpanan Nasional
 CIMB Bank
 Hong Leong Bank
 Maybank
 Public Bank
 RHB Bank

Commercial

 D'Network, Setia Eco Park
 Seria 88
 Setia Alam Uptown
 Setia Avenue
 Setia Eramas 7
 Setia Eramas 8
 Setia Taipan
 Setia Taipan 2  
 Sunsuria 7th Avenue, Setia City
 Setia City Convention Centre
 Setia City Arts And Design Centre, Setia City (coming soon)
 Pasar Malam Setia Alam (The record breaking longest pasar malam in the country)

Corporate HQ
 BrickDotCom HQ Tower (coming soon)
 Eco World Development Group Berhad
 Khind Holdings Berhad HQ Tower (coming soon)
 Kossan HQ Tower (in progress)
 Press Metal Group Berhad
 SP Setia Corporate HQ Tower
 Sunsuria Forum Corporate Office (in progress)
 Top Glove Tower

Drive-thru Restaurants
 Burger King
 KFC
 McDonald's 
 Pizza Hut
 Starbucks Reserve

Health Facilities
 Colombia Asia Klang (Jalan Meru) 
 National Institute Of Health (Institut Penyelidikan Sistem Kesihatan)
 Selgate Hospital (coming soon)
 Setia Gemilang Group Of Clinics (Cardiac Centre)

Hotels
 Courtyard by Marriott Hotel
 Enrich Hotel
 Setia Inn

Malls And Supermarkets
 Giant Hypermarket ( Klang Sentral)
 Jaya Grocer (Eco Ardence)
 Lotus Hypermarket
 Lulu Hypermarket
 Parkson
 Setia City Mall
 Sunsuria The Forum, Setia City (in progress)
 Village Grocer

Parks And Recreation
 Canopy Club, Setia Eco Park
 Central Park
 Mirror Lake ( Tasik Cermin Setia Alam)
 Setia Alam Club
 Setia Alam Forest Trail (Bukit Setia Alam)
 Setia City Park                                                                                  
 Urban Park
 Western Park                                                                                                       
 Wetlands Park

Petrol Stations
 Caltex
 Petron
 Petronas
 Shell

Schools

 SJK (C) Pin Hwa 1
 SJK (Tamil) North Hummock
 SRK Bandar Setia Alam
 SMK Bandar Setia Alam
 Tenby Private and International Schools
 The Peninsula School (Australia) 
 Idrissi International School
 Setia Badminton Academy

Serviced Apartments and SOHO
 Setia City Residence, Setia City
 Trefoil SOFO, Setia City

3S/4S Automotive Centres
 Audi
 BMW
 Honda
 Mazda
 Mercedes Benz
 Mini Cars
 Peugeot
 Proton
 Subaru
 Toyota
 Volkswagen
 Volvo Cars

References

External links
 Majlis Bandaraya Shah Alam
 

Townships in Selangor